Stigmatomma testaceum, is a species of ant in the subfamily Amblyoponinae. The type locality is Sri Lanka.

References

External links

 at antwiki.org

Amblyoponinae
Insects described in 1863